Isaiah 31 is the thirty-first chapter of the Book of Isaiah in the Hebrew Bible or the Old Testament of the Christian Bible. This book contains the prophecies attributed to the prophet Isaiah, and is one of the Books of the Prophets. The Jerusalem Bible groups chapters 28–35 together as a collection of "poems on Israel and Judah". Biblical commentators Keil and Delitzsch note that "again and again", Isaiah returns to the subject of Judah's alliance with Egypt, this chapter being a notable example.

Text 
The original text was written in Hebrew language. This chapter is divided into 9 verses.

Textual witnesses
Some early manuscripts containing the text of this chapter in Hebrew are found among the Dead Sea Scrolls, i.e., the Isaiah Scroll (1Qlsa; complete; 356-100 BCE), and of the Masoretic Text tradition, which includes Codex Cairensis (895 CE), the Petersburg Codex of the Prophets (916), Aleppo Codex (10th century), Codex Leningradensis (1008).

There is also a translation into Koine Greek known as the Septuagint, made in the last few centuries BCE. Extant ancient manuscripts of the Septuagint version include Codex Vaticanus (B; B; 4th century), Codex Sinaiticus (S; BHK: S; 4th century), Codex Alexandrinus (A; A; 5th century) and Codex Marchalianus (Q; Q; 6th century).

Parashot
The parashah sections listed here are based on the Aleppo Codex. Isaiah 31 is a part of the Prophecies about Judah and Israel (Isaiah 24–35). {P}: open parashah; {S}: closed parashah.
 {P} 31:1-3 {S} 31:4-9 {P}

Analysis
Chapters 28–35 form a six-part unity, marked with the recurrence of the word 'Woe' or 'Ho!' (Isaiah 28:1; 29:1, 15; 30:1; 31:1; 33:1) with a balance between two sets of three woes: the first three offer 'principles of divine action', whereas the second three give 'matching applications to history and eschatology' as follows:

Chapters 30–32 specifically deals with Egypt and Assyrians while placing the Messianic kingdom alongside the downfall of Assyria (Isaiah 31:8–32:1; cf. Isaiah 10:33–11:1ff).

Woe to those who trust Egypt (31:1–3)
This section reminds the futility of turning to Egypt for help, that was spoken in 30:1-5.

Verse 1

 taught that the Israelite kings were not to keep many horses, marry many wives, or amass excess silver and gold.
"Chariots...and... horsemen": evocative of the Exodus account, where
'Pharaoh's chariots and his army were cast into the sea' (Exodus 15:4).

God will deliver Jerusalem (31:4–9)

Verse 4
Robert Lowth's translation:

The NIV and NKJV treat the reference to the shepherds' intervention as a parenthesis:

New International Version:

See also
Assyria
Egypt
Israel
Jerusalem
Zion
Related Bible parts: Deuteronomy 17, Hebrews 4

References

Sources

External links

Jewish
Isaiah 31 Hebrew with Parallel English

Christian
Isaiah 31 English Translation with Parallel Latin Vulgate

31